Khambeshwarwadi No.2 is a village in Poladpur taluka in Raigad district of state of Maharashtra, India.

Religion
The majority of the population in the village is Hindu.

Economy
The majority of the population has farming as their primary occupation.

References

External links
 No.2

Villages in Raigad district